The 1922 New South Wales state election was for 90 seats representing 24 electoral districts, with each district returning between 3 and 5 members. This was the second election in New South Wales that took place under a modified Hare-Clark voting system. The average number of enrolled voters per member was 13,785, ranging from Sturt (10,386) to Ryde (15,722).

Results by electoral district

Balmain

Bathurst

Botany

Byron

Cootamundra

Cumberland

Eastern Suburbs

Goulburn

Maitland

Murray

Murrumbidgee

Namoi

Newcastle

North Shore

Northern Tableland

Oxley

Parramatta

Ryde

St George

Sturt

Sydney

Wammerawa

Petition and recount
Joseph Clark petitioned the Governor against the return of William Ashford, alleging that the returning officer made an error in calculating the transfer value for the distribution of surplus to quota votes. The Committee of Elections and Qualifications upheld the petition, overturning the election of Ashford and declaring that Clark was elected as the member for Wammerawa.

Western Suburbs

Wollondilly

See also 

 Candidates of the 1922 New South Wales state election
 Members of the New South Wales Legislative Assembly, 1922–1925

Notes

References 

1922